The 1978 UCI Juniors Track World Championships were the fourth annual Junior World Championship for track cycling held in Washington, D.C., United States in August 1978. Washington, D.C. was the host city for the 1978 Junior World Championships, but the track events were held at the Trexlertown Velodrome (PA). It was the first championship to be held outside Europe

The Championships had five events for men only, Sprint, Points race, Individual pursuit, Team pursuit and 1 kilometre time trial.

Events

Medal table

References

UCI Juniors Track World Championships
1978 in track cycling
Track cycling
International cycle races hosted by the United States